Olonzac is a commune in the Hérault department in the Occitanie region in southern France.

It is known as the "capital of the Minervois".

Village life
A market is held in the town every Tuesday.

There are several cafes in the town and shops including a Post Office and pharmacy.

The schools are Ecole Maternelle Henri Matisse and Ecole Elementaire Jean-Pierre Malric, both located by "La Condamine", and College Antoine Faure, located west of the park.

There is a large park east of the town centre, a boulodrome and tennis courts.

Population

See also
Communes of the Hérault department

References

Communes of Hérault